Kayabaşı is a district of Başakşehir in İstanbul.

Kayabaşı was a district of Bakırköy until 1987 then it was a quarter of Küçükçekmece where was a part of the Çatalca kaza until 1908. By the last change of administrative division of İstanbul in 2009 it is a quarter of Başakşehir.

Geography 

Kayabaşı is located about 4 km to north of Lake Küçükçekmece over Yarımburgaz Cave, about 1 km to west of Sazlıdere Dam and 5 km to south of Arnavutköy (Greek: Αρναούτκιοϊ) over Şamlar village. There is a new settlement, namely Kayaşehir which started to established in 2010 in the region.

Etymology 
"Kaya" means rocky in Turkish. It has taken Kaya-başı name in Turkish due to the rocky terrain.

Population 

It has about 450 households of mübadil (i.e. people exchanged during the Greco-Turkish population exchange) the in old village centre. It has taken over migration all over Turkey because of the established industrial site in the district. According to the administrative addition with new city of Kayaşehir it had a population of 60.191 in 2015 census.

History

History of region

Yarımburgaz Cave 
Yarımburgaz Cave has a historical importance for İstanbul. The cave is an important fossil site which has been researched by archeologists, paleontologists, geoarchaeologists and biospeleologists.
In the Byzantine era, a cave-church was carved into the walls of the upper cave, and a monastery was built outside the cave mouth. Some artifacts found in Yarımburgaz Cave are exhibited in the Istanbul Archaeology Museums.

Azatlı Baruthanesi 
The :tr:Azatlı Baruthanesi (Azatlı Gunpowder Mill) was built in 1795 to serve the purpose of producing gunpowder for the Ottoman Army. Due to necessity of water for producing gunpowder Şamlar Bendi was built in Mahmut II's reign in 1826-1828. It was operated by Dadian family who was an Ottoman Armenian. Privileges were granted by Sultan to Armenian workforce in the region to produce gunpowder. On account of that privilege the region was known as Azatlı. The Baruthane was destroyed during the Russo-Turkish War (1877–78) by Russian Army and closed.

Şamlar village 
The oldest building in the village is a mosque dated 1839 and school is dated 1903. A part of village territory was confiscated during the construction of Sazlıdere Dam.

Resneli Farm 
After the Second Constitutional Era of the Ottoman Empire a farm was established in place of Azatlık; the farm was known as Resneli Farm referring to Resneli Niyazi Bey, a military officer from Resen (then a part of Ottoman Empire), who was a hero of Young Turk Revolution in 1908. Aftermath Ottoman Armanians send away from Azatlı.

Population Exchange 

Because of Treaty of Lausanne village was included the Greco-Turkish population exchange of 1923. Muslim inhabitants left from Kovitsa in Drama by train from Drama train station. Muslim inhabitants firstly settled in Yeşilköy in Istanbul but it is not suitable for animal husbandry especially goat raising. Then they settled in Kayabaşı and Mahmutşevketpaşa in Istanbul, and also others Halitpaşa in Manisa, Kadıköy in Keşan, Yağcılar in Akhisar and some villages of Orhangazi, and İznik in Bursa, hence Orthodox Christian inhabitants in Kayabaşı most of them went to Kayalar(Greek: Πτολεμαΐδα, Ptolemaïda) in Greece from Turkey.

Orthodox inhabitants of Kayabaşı marked living by vineyard and farming in particular. Kayabaşı remains water wells and tile drain ruins and part of wall ruins of church from Orthodox inhabitants. There are remained houses which was built by Orthodox inhibitans and there are still some old houses which was built by first Muslim inhabitants.

There were two church in Kayabaşı during the population exchange. Current mosque was built from a different palace of church with demolished church materials in 1950s. There was a school which was built in 1930s rebuilt with current school building in 2000s.

Nowadays, livestock and farming is gradually decreasing because of expropriation to establish new city cite. Some of villagers migrated abord because of changing business facilities.

Gallery

References

External links 
 Kayabasimahallesi.com
 istanbulkayasehir.com
 Visiting from Kayalar 
 A visitor from Greece 
 Visiting from Greece
 Association of the exchanged Turkish people Kayabaşı Selanikliler Derneği (in Turkish)
 Tarihi süreçte mübadelenin sebepleri ve Lozan’daki mübadele konusu (in Turkish)
 Türk hikayesinde mübadele, F.Sakallı (in Turkish)
 Mübadele tarihinden sayfalar (in Turkish)

Villages in Istanbul Province
Başakşehir